Marshall Dyllon was an American country music group formed in 2000, comprising vocalists Daniel Cahoon, Jesse Littleton, Michael Martin, Paul Martin, and Todd Michael Sansom. These five members were recruited by country music artist Kenny Rogers and talent manager Lou Pearlman, in an attempt to bring the boy band sound to the country music scene.

Excluding Kenny Rogers himself, Marshall Dyllon was the first act to be signed to Dreamcatcher Records, an independent label which Rogers owned. The group's singular album, Enjoy the Ride, was released that year. It accounted for the chart singles "Live It Up" and "You". The band released a third single, "She Ain't Gonna Cry", in 2001 before disbanding.

Biography
Lou Pearlman, the talent manager responsible for the Backstreet Boys and 'N Sync, teamed up with country music artist Kenny Rogers to create the lineup of Marshall Dyllon as an attempt to bring the then-popular boy band sound to the country music scene. Rogers and Lou found Paul Martin, Michael Martin (Paul's younger brother), Dan Cahoon, Todd Sansom, and Jesse Littleton. Paul Martin and Jesse Littleton had previously auditioned on the ABC television series Making the Band, where both were offered opportunities to become members of what eventually became O-Town, another boy band.

Eventually, the group decided on assuming the name Marshall Dyllon, an altered spelling of the character Marshal Matt Dillon from the television series Gunsmoke. All five members alternated as lead vocalists, while Sansom co-wrote several of the songs and handled the vocal arrangements. Marshall Dyllon opened for Rogers and several other prominent country music personalities. On December 5, 2000, Marshall Dyllon released their first album, entitled Enjoy the Ride. The album included songs co-written by Phil Vassar, who had written several country songs for other artists and was just beginning his own career as a successful country music artist. Overall, Enjoy the Ride produced two singles on the U.S. Billboard country singles charts. An additional single, "She Ain't Gonna Cry", which was previously recorded by its co-writer Joel Feeney, was issued before Marshall Dyllon was disbanded in 2001.

Discography

Albums

Singles

Music videos

References

External links
Todd Sansom official website

Country music groups from Texas
Lou Pearlman
Musical groups established in 2000
Musical groups disestablished in 2001
Musical groups from Texas
Vocal quintets